Charles Théophile Bruand d'Uzelle (5 March 1808, Besançon – 3 August 1861, Besançon) was a French entomologist who specialised in microlepidoptera. He described several new species and erected the families Elachistidae, Oecophoridae and Roeslerstammiidae and the geometrid  tribes Ourapterygini and Hemitheini. He was a member of the Société entomologique de France. His macrolepidoptera and Psychidae collections are held by the Natural History Museum, London and the microlepidoptera by the Musee d'Histoire Naturelle, Paris.

Works
Bruand d'Uzelle, C. T. (1841) Notices sur quelques Lépidoptères très-rares, ou nouveaux pour le département du Doubs, Annales de la société d'émulation du Doubs
Bruand d'Uzelle, C. T. (1845-47)  Catalogue systématique et synonymique des lépidoptères du Département du Doubs, Annales de la société d'émulation du Doubs
Bruand d'Uzelle, C. T. (1848)  Monographie des Lépidoptères nuisibles, Annales de la société d'émulation du Doubs
Bruand d'Uzelle, C. T. (1852)  Monographie des Psychides, Annales de la société d'émulation du Doubs read online
Bruand d'Uzelle, C. T. (1859) Essai monographique sur le genre Coleophora, Annales de la société entomologique de France.
Bruand d'Uzelle, C. T. (1859)  Observations sur divers lépidoptères, description d'espèces nouvelles propres à la faune française, Annales de la société entomologique de France.

References
 Gaedike, R.; Groll, E. K. & Taeger, A. 2012: Bibliography of the entomological literature from the beginning until 1863: online database – version 1.0 – Senckenberg Deutsches Entomologisches Institut.
Groll, E. K. 2017: Biographies of the Entomologists of the World. – Online database, version 8, Senckenberg Deutsches Entomologisches Institut, Müncheberg – URL: sdei.senckenberg.de/biografies
Millière, P. 1861: Notice nécrologue sur Ch.-Th. Bruand d'Uzelle. Annales de la Société Entomologique de France, 4. Série 1, S. 651-656 1882, pp. +Schr.verz

1808 births
1861 deaths
French lepidopterists
Scientists from Besançon
19th-century French zoologists